Sporting Clube de Portugal, referred to colloquially as Sporting, Sporting CP or Sporting Lisbon, is a Portuguese sports club based in Lisbon. The club is particularly renowned for its football branch. With more than 100,000 registered club members, Sporting is one of the most successful and popular sports clubs in Portugal. Its teams, athletes and supporters are often nicknamed Os Leões.

Key 

Table headers
Pos – Final position in the league classification
Pld – Number of league matches played
W – Number of league matches won
D – Number of league matches drawn
L – Number of league matches lost
GF – Number of goals scored in league matches
GA – Number of goals conceded in league matches
Pts – Number of points at the end of the league

Divisions
Regional – Lisbon regional championship

Results and rounds
  1st  or  W  – Champion or Winner
  2nd  or  RU  – Runner-up
 SF – Semi-finals
 QF – Quarter-finals
 R16, R32, R64, R128 – Round of 16, 32, 64, 128
 R1, R2, R3, R4 – First, second, third, fourth round
 GS, GS2 – (First) Group stage, second group stage
 PO – Play-off round
 Q3 – Third qualifying round
 PR – Preliminary round

Top-scorers
Players whose name is in italics were also the regional championship or Primeira Liga top-scorers.
GS – Players who were also top-scorers in Europe (European Golden Shoe).

Seasons

Notes

References

External links

Official website 

Portuguese football club seasons
 
Seasons